Temidayo Babatope Joseph, popularly known by his stage name PuffyTee, is a Nigerian singer-songwriter and record producer. from Ekiti state, Nigeria. In 2016, he was given a special recognition award by the organisers of the City People Entertainment Awards for his contribution to the growth of entertainment in Nigeria   Puffy Tee is the producer behind the songs "Yahooze" by Olu Maintain, "Eleko" by Mayorkun, "Lorile" by X-Project, "Away" by VVIP, and "Aiye" by 9ice, plus "Kabiyesi" and "Back to Back" by Funmi Shittu. He has also worked with Oritse Femi, Davido, JJC, Georgetown, Kabbar, LKT, Mike Abdul of Midnight Crew, and Monique. The track that was issued by Puffy Tee as a verse writer is named "Packing" and it was a joint work with "the Nigerian born London & Lagos-based rapper, singer, producer" JJC Skillz. In 2015, he also featured the Nigerian drummer, dancer and singer, Ara, to produce a love song titled, "Your Lover".

References

Nigerian hip hop singers
Nigerian singer-songwriters
Nigerian hip hop record producers
Year of birth missing (living people)
Place of birth missing (living people)
Living people